HMS Borage was a  that served in the Royal Navy during World War II.

Construction 
Borage was ordered in July 1939 as part of the Royal Navy's 1939 War Emergency building programme. She was laid down by George Brown & Co. of Greenock on 27 November 1940, launched on 22 November 1941 and completed on 29 April 1942. After working up and sea trials she joined Western Approaches Command for anti-submarine warfare and convoy escort duties

Service history 
From July 1942 onwards Borage served with close escort groups for convoys on the North Atlantic, Gibraltar and South Atlantic routes. In three years she helped guard more than 50 merchant convoys (outbound and homebound); from these just two ships were damaged and none were lost. Borage contributed to the safe and timely arrival of more than 1,000 merchant ships. In December 1943 she was part of the close escort to convoy JW 55B, which was subject to a failed attack resulting in the sinking of the German battleship Scharnhorst.
With the end of hostilities Borage was decommissioned and in 1946 she was sold.

Post-war service 
She was scrapped in November 1970.

Notes

Publications 
 
 Gardiner R, Chesnau R: Conway's All the World's Fighting Ships 1922–1946 (1980) 
 Elliott, P : Allied Escort Ships of World War II  (1977)  
 Ruegg, B, Hague A: Convoys to Russia 1941–1945 (1992)

External links 
 HMS Borage at uboat.net

 

Flower-class corvettes of the Royal Navy
1941 ships